The following is a list of the chapters of the Sigma Phi Epsilon fraternity. They are listed by school name, their Greek letter designation, and the year in which it was first chartered. Inactive (closed) chapters are noted in italics, while chapters that are currently Sigma Epsilon Chapters (SEC: newly formed chapters not yet chartered, sometimes known as "colonies") and chapters which are Residential Learning Communities (RLC) are noted as well.

List of Sigma Phi Epsilon chapters by state

Alabama

Alaska

Arizona

Arkansas

California

Colorado

Connecticut

District of Columbia D.C.

Delaware

Florida

Georgia

Hawaii

Idaho

Illinois

Indiana

Iowa

Kansas

Kentucky

Louisiana

Maine

Maryland

Massachusetts

Michigan

Minnesota

Mississippi

Missouri

Montana

Nebraska

Nevada

New Hampshire

New Jersey

New Mexico

New York

North Carolina

Ohio

Oklahoma

Oregon

Pennsylvania

Rhode Island

South Carolina

South Dakota

Tennessee

Texas

Utah

Vermont

Virginia

Washington

West Virginia

Wisconsin

Wyoming

List of chapters by founding

References

Lists of chapters of United States student societies by society
chapters